The common cardinal veins, also known as the ducts of Cuvier, are veins that drain into the sinus venosus during embryonic  development. These drain an anterior cardinal vein and a posterior cardinal vein on each side. Each of the ducts of Cuvier receives an ascending vein. The ascending veins return the blood from the parietes of the trunk and from the Wolffian bodies, and are called cardinal veins. Part of the left common cardinal vein persists after birth to form the coronary sinus.

Additional images

See also
 Georges Cuvier

References

External links
 

Embryology of cardiovascular system